Fratelli Benvenuti is an Italian television series, acted at shopping mall "La Corte Lombarda" in Bellinzago Lombardo.

Cast
Fathy El Gharbawy - Father Krishna
Massimo Boldi -  Lorenzo
Barbara De Rossi - Teresa
Enzo Salvi - Claudio
Elisabetta Canalis - Krishna
Massimo Ciavarro - Angelo
Gea Lionello - Elvira
Loredana De Nardis - Lara
Lucrezia Piaggio - Giorgia
Davide Silvestri - Renato
I Fichi d'India -  Louis and Jean
Gisella Sofio - The Conuntess
Paolo Ferrari - Pericle
Elisabetta Gregoraci -  Chiara
Gloria Guida - Doris
Nina Torresi - Camilla
Valerio Morigi - Luca
Valeria Graci - Maria
Manuela Boldi - Grazia
Eleonora Gaggioli - Angela
David Sebasti - Paolo
Lorenzo Vavassori - Pippo
Charlie Gnocchi - Primo
Alessandro Sampaoli - Raffaello
Paolo Migone - Michele
I Turbolenti - Security
Paola Onofri - Donatella
Claudia Lawrence -

See also
List of Italian television series

External links
 

Italian television series
Canale 5 original programming
Rete 4 original programming